Deyamos Rural LLG is a local-level government (LLG) of Morobe Province, Papua New Guinea.

Wards
01. Hamelengan
02. Komutu
03. Yalument Station
04. Etaino
05. Birimon
06. Gomandat
07. Lewemon
08. Takop
09. Timovon
10. Mumunggam
11. Sambangan
12. Ongakei
13. Yakop
14. Yandu
15. Derim
16. Songgin

References

Local-level governments of Morobe Province